Kanne Kalaimaane is a 2019 Indian Tamil-language romantic drama film written and directed by Seenu Ramasamy. The film stars Udhayanidhi Stalin and Tamannaah. The film is produced by Udhayanidhi under his Red Giant Movies. The music was composed by Yuvan Shankar Raja, and the film released on 22 February 2019.

Plot
Kamalakannan, an agriculture graduate doing organic farming, meets with the newly-appointed bank manager Bharathi regarding unpaid bank loans. She later learns about his aide to the poor village people by obtaining loans for them and comes to appreciate him. The romance opens to a wedding after a meeting between both families. Kannan's father Ramasamy and grandmother Appatha are skeptic about Bharathi as an educated and well-employed woman's integration to their simple rural family. Ramasamy arranges for the couple to live in a separate house to avoid problems between Appatha and Bharathi, as she does not approve that Bharathi continues her work after marriage. Suddenly, Bharathi loses her vision and Kannan takes her to hospital where it is diagnosed that the blindness is heredity related and there is no treatment available to cure (Bharathi's mother also lost her vision a few years back). Bharathi feels bad and requests Kannan to not to inform his family as they might develop even more hatred towards her. Kannan tries hard to get Bharathi cured by taking her to different hospitals. Kannan borrows money from a local money lender for meeting Bharathi's medical expenses. As Kannan is unable to repay, the money lender hits him in front of everyone which shocks Kannan's father and appatha. Appatha gets furious and repays Kannan's debt to the money lender. Appatha visits Kannan's home and finds the truth about Bharathi's situation. Appatha feels sad for Bharathi and takes her along with her to her home. Kannan, upon knowing this feels happy that Bharathi is accepted by his family. Bharathi also feels happy about the care shown by appatha. Kannan gets a phone call from the doctor referring Bharathi to meet a doctor in Delhi who seems to be able to cure her blindness. The movie ends with Kannan and Bharathi travelling to Delhi.

Cast 

Udhayanidhi Stalin as Kamalakannan, an agriculture graduate and organic farmer
Tamannaah as Bharathi, the manager of Madurai Grama Bank
Vadivukkarasi as Kannan's grandmother
Vasundhara Kashyap as Muthulakshmi, Kannan's classmate 
Poo Ram as Ramasamy, Kannan's father 
Shaji Chen as Bank Manager 
Ambani Shankar as Kannan's friend
Saravana Sakthi as Karuppu, Kannan's friend
Theepetti Ganesan as Kannan's friend
Vinayak Raj as Kannan's friend
Chandran Pachamuthu as Chandran, Muthulakshmi's husband
Vetri Kumaran as Asst. Manager Vetri Kumaran
V. R. Nagendran as Nagendran
Devipriya as Kannan's mother
Aathmaarthi as Aathmaarthi
Thavasi as Saamy

Production 
After the commercial success of Dharma Durai (2016) starring Vijay Sethupathi, Seenu Ramasamy who also has the credit of introducing Vijay Sethupathi in Tamil cinema announced the film title Kanne Kalaimaane.  Udhayanidhi Stalin joined in as the hero and producer and Tamannaah who also was the heroine of Dharma Durai was hired to play the female lead. Jalandhar Vasan, a former student from the Balu Mahendra Film School who was shooting a song for Arasiyalla Idhellam Saadharnamappa was signed to be the cinematographer. Kasi Viswanathan signed to edit the film. Filming started in January 2018 in the green villages near Madurai. The film shoot finished in 45 days in a single schedule on 14 March 2018.

The film is titled after a song from the 1982 film Moondram Pirai (1982) directed by Balu Mahendra who was also the Guru of Seenu Ramasamy. This line was written by Kannadasan and composed by Ilaiyaraaja and sung by K J Yesudas.

Soundtrack 
The soundtrack of the film was composed by Yuvan Shankar Raja, working with Udhayanidhi Stalin for the first time.

Reception 
The News Minute gave 3 out of 5 stars and wrote "An interesting drama with a few quibbles". The Hindu wrote "A well-intentioned, well-performed drama that tries discussing more issues than it ought to" and praised the performances of the cast and criticized the screenplay. The Times of India gave 3 out of 5 stars and wrote "Kanne Kalaimaane feels like an amiable drama about genial characters".

References

External links 
 

2010s Tamil-language films
2019 films
2019 romantic drama films
Films about diseases
Films directed by Seenu Ramasamy
Films scored by Yuvan Shankar Raja
Films shot in Madurai
Indian romantic drama films